Trinity Health Stadium (formerly Dillon Stadium) is a multipurpose facility in Hartford, Connecticut.  It has been host to concerts and sporting events.  It was formerly the home of the New England Nightmare of the Women's Football Alliance (WFA). It is now the home of USL Championship club Hartford Athletic.  The UConn Huskies men's and women's soccer teams played a majority of their 2019 matches at Dillon Stadium after starting their seasons at Al-Marzook Field in West Hartford, Connecticut.

Sports

Football
Dillon Stadium was built in 1935. Formerly named Municipal Stadium, it was renamed in 1956 after James H. Dillon, the City's recreation director.  Dillon Stadium was the home of two minor league football teams in the 1960s and 70s: the Hartford Charter Oaks of the Atlantic Coast Football League and Continental Football League, owned by the Brewer family, and the Hartford Knights, also of the ACFL and Seaboard Football League. Dillon is now used primarily for high school football teams, including the Bulkeley Bulldogs, the Sport Medical Tigers, the Prince Tech Falcons, and the Capital Prep Trailblazers. Dillon also hosts the annual Thanksgiving Day Turkey Game between Hartford Public Owls and the Weaver Beavers.  Lights were added in 1964 to accommodate the Oaks. The stadium also hosted occasional club-level college football games hosted by the University of Hartford. The Hartford Colonials of the United Football League, in part because of a change of management at Rentschler Field, experienced significant delays in renewing their lease for the 2011 season and had backup plans to relocate to Dillon Stadium (or Willow Brook Park), although neither venue was believed to be ideal for the UFL. The Colonials did sign a deal with Rentschler in June, but suspended operations on August 10, 2011; the league later folded it outright.

Soccer

International matches

Professional matches

College

Rugby

Renovation

Hartford City FC, a projected indoor soccer franchise that also hoped to compete in the outdoor North American Soccer League, announced plans to reconstruct Dillon Stadium to create a 15,000 seat soccer-only stadium for the 2017 season.

In 2014, the city awarded a $12 million contract to Premier Sports Management to redevelop the stadium in hopes of attracting a professional soccer team. The company was unable to interest various soccer leagues and instead partnered with an outside investor seeking to build a larger stadium on the site with city funding. However, the city ended the project in October 2015 over financial and legal concerns with the investment group, who were later found guilty of embezzling $1 million from the redevelopment fund.

On February 17, 2018, the State Bond Commission approved $10 million in public funding. This would help the Hartford Sports Group establish a USL club in 2019.

Concerts
On June 27, 1966, The Rolling Stones played in Dillon Stadium, supported by The McCoys (with their up-and-coming guitarist, Rick Derringer). Near the end of the Stones' performance, fans rushed the stage, so electricity to the amplifiers was cut. Mick Jagger threw his microphone stand out into the crowd, and the Stones then left the venue, as fans began breaking chairs. Police gathered the crowd towards the exits.

The Beach Boys performed there in 1972 and again in 1973.

On July 16, 1972, the Grateful Dead played in Dillon Stadium and were joined on stage by Dickey Betts, Berry Oakley and Jai Johanny Johanson of the Allman Brothers. Their July 31, 1974, performance at the field was released as an album titled Dave's Picks Volume 2.

References

External links
 
 Trinity Health Stadium at Hartford Athletic
 Hartford's Dillon Stadium at JCJ Architecture

American football venues in Connecticut
Sports venues in Hartford, Connecticut
Sports venues in Hartford County, Connecticut
Rugby union stadiums in the United States
Rugby union stadiums in Connecticut
Minor league baseball venues
High school football venues in the United States
North American Soccer League (1968–1984) stadiums
Soccer venues in Connecticut
Hartford Athletic
UConn Huskies soccer
USL Championship stadiums
College soccer venues in the United States
1935 establishments in Connecticut
Sports venues completed in 1935